The 1963 October Revolution Parade was a parade on Red Square in Moscow on November 7 1963 for the 46th anniversary of the October Revolution.  Inspecting the parade was Marshal of the Soviet Union Rodion Malinovsky and commanding the parade was the commander of the Moscow Military District, Afanasy Beloborodov.The massed bands of the Military Band Service of the Armed Forces of the Soviet Union 
led by Major General Nikolai Nazarov was playing the military marches. The parade officially began at the chimes of the Kremlin Clock at 10:00. It has one of the earliest records of the full parade.

References

1963 in Russia
October Revolution parades
1963 in Moscow
November 1963 events in Europe